Muguette Dini (born 16 March 1940) is a French politician and a former member of the Senate of France. She represented the Rhône department and is a member of the Centrist Alliance.

References
Page on the Senate website

1940 births
Living people
Union for French Democracy politicians
Democratic Movement (France) politicians
Centrist Alliance politicians
French Senators of the Fifth Republic
Women members of the Senate (France)
21st-century French women politicians
Senators of Rhône (department)